Michaela Walsh (born 5 June 1993) is an amateur boxer from Ireland who fights in the featherweight division (54 – 57 kg). Walsh is an Olympian, who competed at the 2020 Tokyo Olympic Games.

In the 2014 Commonwealth Games in Glasgow Walsh took the silver medal at flyweight . In 2018 she moved to featherweight and again won silver. In the 2022 Commonwealth games held in Birmingham, Michaela won Gold.

Michaela and Aidan her brother, became the first brother and sister to qualify for the Tokyo Olympic Games in boxing, both qualifying in June 2021.

Her brother Aidan is also a Commonwealth champion in boxing, also winning bronze at Tokyo 2020 for team Ireland.

Both boxing out of Emerald boxing club in Belfast.

References

https://olympics.com/en/athletes/michaela-walsh-x9302

https://www.belfastlive.co.uk/sport/boxing/michaela-walsh-hails-dream-come-24695801.amp

https://www.times-series.co.uk/sport/national/20607078.michaela-walsh-dreamland-northern-ireland-enjoy-boxing-gold-rush/

https://www.iba.sport/news/michaela-walsh-invested-19-years-of-work-to-take-her-first-commonwealth-games-gold-after-two-silvers/

https://www.rte.ie/sport/boxing/2022/0807/1314438-gold-for-walsh-siblings-at-the-commonwealth-games/

https://olympics.com/en/athletes/michaela-walsh-x9302
 
 
 
 
 

1993 births
Living people
British women boxers
Commonwealth Games medallists in boxing
Commonwealth Games silver medallists for Northern Ireland
Boxers at the 2014 Commonwealth Games
Boxers at the 2018 Commonwealth Games
Boxers at the 2019 European Games
European Games medalists in boxing
European Games silver medalists for Ireland
Featherweight boxers
Olympic boxers of Ireland
Boxers at the 2020 Summer Olympics
Medallists at the 2014 Commonwealth Games
Medallists at the 2018 Commonwealth Games